Oizon is a commune in the Cher department in the Centre-Val de Loire region of France.

Geography
The rivers Nère and Oizenotte flow through the commune.

Population

Sights
 The church of St. Martial, dating from the thirteenth century.
Château de la Verrerie (Cher)
 A watermill.

See also
Communes of the Cher department

References

Communes of Cher (department)